Samwel Mwera Chegere (born 3 June 1985) is a Tanzanian middle distance runner who specializes in the 800 and 1500 metres. He was born in Musoma.

Competition record

Personal bests
800 metres - 1:45.28 min (2005)
1500 metres - 3:35.42 min (2004)
5000 metres - 13:29.14 min (2005)

External links

1985 births
Living people
People from Musoma
People from Mara Region
Tanzanian male middle-distance runners
Olympic athletes of Tanzania
Athletes (track and field) at the 2004 Summer Olympics
Athletes (track and field) at the 2008 Summer Olympics
Athletes (track and field) at the 2006 Commonwealth Games
Commonwealth Games competitors for Tanzania
African Games gold medalists for Tanzania
African Games medalists in athletics (track and field)
Athletes (track and field) at the 2003 All-Africa Games